Maḥmūd ʿAlāmīr, also known as Masʿūd Davallū and by the bestowed title Ehtesham ol-Saltaneh was a Qajari nobleman, diplomat and constitutionalist politician.

References 

1863 births
1936 deaths
Qajar princes
People of the Persian Constitutional Revolution
Speakers of the National Consultative Assembly
Members of the 1st Iranian Majlis
Members of the 2nd Iranian Majlis
Members of the 3rd Iranian Majlis
Ambassadors of Iran to the Ottoman Empire
Ambassadors of Iran to Germany
Qajar governors of Zanjan
19th-century Iranian politicians
20th-century Iranian politicians